Portland International Airport  is a joint civil–military airport and the largest airport in the U.S. state of Oregon, accounting for 90% of the state's passenger air travel and more than 95% of its air cargo. Portland International Airport is often referred to by its IATA airport code, PDX. The airport covers 3,000 acres (1,214 ha) of land.

Portland International Airport has direct flights and connections to most major airports throughout the United States, and non-stop international flights to Canada, Germany, Japan, Mexico, the Netherlands, South Korea, Iceland and the United Kingdom. The airport is a hub for Alaska Airlines. It also has a maintenance facility for Alaska Air subsidiary Horizon Air. General aviation services are provided at PDX by Atlantic Aviation. The Oregon Air National Guard has a base on the southwest portion of the airport property grounds, and is also the host unit of the 142nd Fighter Wing (142 FW), which operates the F-15 Eagle. Local transportation includes the MAX Red Line light rail, which takes passengers between PDX and downtown Portland, as well as farther west to Beaverton. There is also Interstate 205, which connects to southwestern Washington (north from PDX) along with many suburbs of Portland (south from PDX).

PDX receives top honors among many polls: Travel + Leisure magazine 2013 readers' poll for best US airport; Condé Nast Traveler in 2006, 2007, 2008, and 2010: top airport for business travelers; #1 in 2015, 2016, and 2019 by J.D. Power and Associates for U.S. "Large Passenger Airports" and overall highest amongst passenger satisfaction; the 2015 ALPA Airport of the Year.

History
Portland's first airport was the Swan Island Municipal Airport, northwest of downtown Portland on the Willamette River. The Port of Portland purchased  and construction began in 1926. Charles Lindbergh flew in and dedicated the new airfield in 1927.

By 1935 it was becoming apparent to the Port of Portland that the airport was becoming obsolete. The small airfield couldn't easily be expanded, nor could it accommodate the larger aircraft and passenger loads expected to become common to Portland. Plans immediately were conceived to relocate the outdated airfield to a larger site. The Swan Island area is now used by the Port of Portland as an industrial park.

Construction and early operations
The Portland City Council purchased the present PDX site in 1936. It was  bordered by the Columbia River in the north and the Columbia Slough in the south. The city council issued US$300,000 and asked the Port of Portland to sponsor a US$1.3 million Works Progress Administration (WPA) grant to develop the site into a "super airport". The project provided badly needed Great Depression-era jobs. Construction of the airport steadily employed over 1,000 men, and was described by historian Neil Barker as "Portland's most significant public works improvement during the New Deal era". The WPA and Port of Portland faced difficulties in preparing the site for construction because the low-lying area was frequently covered by flood waters from the Columbia River. Two runways capable of serving the modern aircraft of the time were operational by 1941. The airport was designated Portland–Columbia Airport to distinguish it from then-operating Swan Island Airport. During World War II, the airfield was used by the United States Army Air Forces.

The "super airport" had a terminal on the north side, off Marine Drive, and five runways (NE-SW, NW-SE, and an E-W runway forming an asterisk). View airport diagrams: 1955 and 1965

In 1948 the entire airport grounds were flooded during the Vanport Flood, forcing scheduled airline services to reroute to nearby Troutdale Airport. The grounds were under water for several months.

New terminal (1950s)

A new terminal opened in 1959, which for the most part serves as the present facility. The new terminal is located to the east of the original runways, and north of the then-new  runway. Construction of a second east–west runway to the north made this a midfield terminal. At this point, all but the NE-SW (3/21) runway in the original "X" were abandoned and turned into taxiways. 3/21 was extended for use as a cross-wind runway. "International" was added to the airport's official designation after the 1950s-era improvements.

Plans made in 1968 to add a third runway by means of filling in parts of the Columbia River were met with vocal public opposition and scrapped. The airport switched from screening passengers at individual gates to screening all visitors at concourse entrances in 1973 as new FAA regulations went into effect. The terminal building was renovated and expanded in 1977.

By the 1980s, the terminal building began an extensive renovation in order to update PDX to meet future needs. The ticketing and baggage claim areas were renovated and expanded, and a new Concourse D for Alaska Airlines was added in 1986. Concourse E was first to be reconstructed in 1992, and featured PDX's first moving sidewalks. The Oregon Marketplace, a small shopping mall, was added in the former waiting areas behind the ticket counters.

The early 1990s saw a food court and extension added to Concourse C, and the opening of the new Concourse D in 1994. This marked the first concessions inside secured areas, allowing passengers to purchase items without having to be re-screened.

An expanded parking garage, new control tower, and canopy over the curbside were finished in the late 1990s. Although hailed by architectural critics, the canopy blocked views of Mount Hood from the curbside.  On July 31, 1997, during construction, the garage addition collapsed due to inadequate bolts holding girders together and inadequate securing of structural members, killing three steelworkers.

The present H-shape of the PDX terminal, designed by Zimmer Gunsul Frasca Partnership, was completed on September 10, 2001, when the new A, B and C concourses, as well as the light rail line, were finished. Probably the most stunning portion of PDX's interior, the new concourses reflect a Northwest theme, focusing heavily on the nearby Columbia River. A huge celebration was to be held the following weekend, but the events of September 11, 2001, interceded. The new concourses, designed to be public spaces, were closed to non-passengers.

In August 2005, the concourse connector was opened. This is a long hallway on the secure side of the airport that connects the A, B and C concourses to the D and E concourses on the other side of the airport. If there is a long line at the checkpoint at one end of the airport, passengers may use the other checkpoint and walk through the connector to their desired concourse. The connector closed permanently on January 5, 2021, to make room for terminal expansion.

The airport's carpet, installed in 1987, was designed to stylize the criss-crossing north and south runways. Beginning in 2014, a new design replaced the original pattern. In response, many residents created products to celebrate the carpet as a local icon.

In December 2016, The Port of Portland renovated the security checkpoints and immigration facilities as part of its PDXNext project. This included the relocation, and wider of the exit lanes by the security checkpoints and upgraded security on both sides of the terminal.

Terminal expansion (2020s)

In the latter half of 2016, the Port of Portland and several airlines at PDX approved a project intended to balance the use of the terminal and concourses at Portland International Airport. After the project, Southwest Airlines relocated its operations from Concourse C to the newly expanded Concourse E, alongside United Airlines. With the relocation of Southwest Airlines to Concourse E, Alaska Airlines, American Airlines and JetBlue Airways became the primary users of Concourses B and C. Construction on this project began in the spring of 2017 and opened to passengers on July 15, 2020.

Concourse A was demolished in November 2019 due to the age and space of the structure and was replaced by an expanded Concourse B. The extension featured 4 jet bridges, 6 ground loading zones, and improved concession stands. All Horizon operations that operated out of Concourse A was temporarily moved to Concourse C until the expanded Concourse B was completed. The new concourse opened on December 8, 2021.

In March 2020, the main terminal began a 5-year expansion process to generate more open space in the pre-security area and an expansion of 150 feet toward the west. The Concourse Connector was closed in January 2021 and the Clocktower Plaza closed 3 months later to make room for the expansion. During construction, the remains of the concourse connector will be reused for passengers to bypass the construction zone to get to concourses C and D. Construction of the new main terminal is expected to be complete by 2025.

Domestic service

The April 1957 OAG shows 38 United departures per day, ten West Coast, eight Northwest and six Western. Alaska had four a week and Pacific Northern had three; Pan Am and Northwest both flew SEA-PDX-HNL and back, Pan Am with five DC-7C round trips a week and Northwest with four DC-6Bs. Portland's first jets were Pan Am 707-321s about October 1959.

In 1966 PDX had nonstop flights to SLC, DEN, ORD and no other cities farther east than Boise; in 1977 nonstops reached LAS–PHX–DEN–DFW–ORD and no others east of Boise. In 1967 United started PDX's first transcon nonstop, to JFK; it ended in 1973.

By 1974, the airport was served by Braniff, Cascade, Continental, Eastern, Hughes Airwest, Northwest Orient, Pan Am, United and Western, and the Seattle route was served by seven airlines with aircraft as large as Boeing 747s.

Air Oregon started short-haul service from Portland following deregulation in 1978, and by 1979 had routes to seven other cities in Oregon.

In the 1980s Air California had nonstop flights to Seattle, Reno and the Bay Area; PSA (Pacific Southwest Airlines) had nonstops to San Francisco and one or two to Reno and Sacramento. In 2010 Northwest's former Honolulu service was eliminated by Delta altogether. In 2015, Delta resumed its seasonal service to Honolulu.

United was the dominant carrier at PDX during the regulated era and through the 1980s.

On May 30, 2022, Alaska Airlines added New Orleans' Armstrong International Airport to its schedule, and in doing so, added the only domestic FAA-designated "large hub" airport missing from the southern airfield's roster. Flights AS142 and AS143 will operate daily, beginning January 5, 2023, between Portland and New Orleans, operated by a Boeing 737-900ER.

International service
The first international nonstop was Western's 720B to Vancouver in 1967.

United Airlines, then the dominant carrier at PDX, used Portland as a once-weekly stop for its Chicago–O'Hare-Tokyo–Narita service from 1983 to 1987. The flight stopped in Seattle/Tacoma six days a week and in Portland once a week. After United Airlines acquired Pan American World Airways' Asian routes in 1986, they were able to use Pan American World Airways' Boeing 747SP aircraft to eliminate the West Coast stop.

As United Airlines made plans to end Tokyo service from Portland, Delta Air Lines applied to begin Atlanta-Tokyo service via Portland using Lockheed L-1011 aircraft. Like United Airlines, Delta Air Lines lacked aircraft that could fly to Japan nonstop from the eastern United States; Delta Air Lines also lacked a West Coast hub at the time, and saw Portland as favorable international and domestic hub over Seattle, which was dominated by Northwest Airlines. After beginning Tokyo service in 1986, Delta Air Lines added a flight to Seoul in 1988, coinciding with the 1988 Summer Olympics; the Seoul flight was later extended to Hong Kong, Beijing, Shanghai, and Taipei. By 1994, Delta Air Lines had introduced McDonnell Douglas MD-11 aircraft, and added another transpacific flight to Nagoya and domestic flights to New York City, Anchorage, Fairbanks, and other destinations. Delta Air Lines's hub had peaked in 1998, with additional service to Osaka and Fukuoka.

The 1997 Asian Financial Crisis hurt Delta Air Lines's operation, and international travel decreased even further due to complaints about treatment at the immigration facility in Portland, leading it to be nicknamed "DePortland". The combination of these factors caused Delta Air Lines to discontinue what was then the last direct flight from Portland to Tokyo and from Portland to Nagoya in March 2001. This change brought local media scrutiny. This then combined with the resulting congressional pressure, caused the officials in charge of the immigration facility to address the problems.

Meanwhile, local travel businesses had begun recruiting other carriers. Lufthansa started direct flights to Frankfurt, Germany, in 2003, but suspended the route in 2009 citing lack of profitability. Northwest Airlines introduced non-stop flights to Tokyo–Narita on June 10, 2004, reviving a route terminated by Delta. Mexicana Airlines also introduced service to Guadalajara and Mexico City; after 5 years of service, Mexicana Airlines withdrew in 2008 due to high fuel prices and change in demand.

Northwest Airlines added nonstop service to Amsterdam in 2008, which was at one time planned to continue to Mumbai. The service was reduced that year to a Northwest-operated Delta-flown 767-300, and occasionally a Northwest-operated Delta-flown 767-400. The service has since been fluctuating between 767-300s, 767-400s and A330-300s depending on the season. Air Canada operated seasonal service to Toronto–Pearson from 2010 to 2012 but was then resumed in May 2016. Since 2014, three more foreign carriers have begun service at PDX: Volaris with service to Guadalajara, Condor with seasonal service to Frankfurt, and Icelandair with seasonal service to Reykjavík–Keflavík. British Airways also recently announced service to London–Heathrow beginning in June, 2022.

Following its acquisition of Northwest, Delta Air Lines has maintained Northwest's nonstop flights to Amsterdam and Tokyo. The latter required a one-time $3.5 million subsidy from the Port of Portland to Delta in 2009 to maintain the route.

On May 31, 2016, Delta Air Lines announced seasonal nonstop service to London–Heathrow in the United Kingdom, which began on May 26, 2017. This service ended the following year. British Airways announced a year-round service to LHR which is scheduled to start in June 2022.

In May 2017, Delta Air Lines and Aeroméxico announced new non-stop service from Portland to Mexico City using Aeroméxico flown Boeing 737-800 aircraft, which began on December 1, 2017, but ended on January 7, 2019.

On June 3, 2022, British Airways launched a non-stop flight to London Heathrow 4x a week with a Boeing 787-8. It was the first time in 4 years the two cities were connected via nonstop flights.

Terminal
There is one passenger terminal in the airport, with four concourses split between two sides. From January 5, 2021, until late 2023, the two sides are not connected beyond security. The airport also offers many complimentary services such as free Wi-Fi wireless internet access, a children's play area, and postal services.

The airport has a shopping mall behind its ticketing counters, with all shops and restaurants open every day. Because the state is one of the few in the nation with no sales tax, all stores offer tax-free shopping. The Port of Portland also requires all airport shops and restaurants to practice fair retail pricing—businesses are not allowed to charge more than at off-airport locations. Stores include national stores and Oregon-based ones such as Made in Oregon, Nike, Columbia Sportswear, Powell's Books, and Oregon Pendleton Shop among others.  Food services also are a mix of national chains and local options.

Several local food carts are located within the pre-security concourse.

Concourses and terminals
The two sections of the main terminal (South and North) at Portland International Airport have four concourses (B, C, D, E). In addition, Portland International Airport handles many operations from a variety of cargo transportation airlines.

The international section of Concourse D was renamed the Governor Victor G. Atiyeh International Concourse to honor the former Oregon governor, who was also known as "Trader Vic" for launching international tourism and trade initiatives during his gubernatorial term.

South Terminal
Concourse B has 10 gates (B1–B10)
Concourse C has 23 gates (C1–C23)
North Terminal
Concourse D has 15 gates (D1–D15)
Concourse E has 12 gates (E2–E13)

There are 60 gates within the two passenger terminals.

Airport lounges
South Terminal
 Concourse B: None
 Concourse C: Alaska Lounge – across from Gate C5
North Terminal
 Concourse D: Delta Sky Club – across from Gate D6
 Concourse E: United Club – across from Gate E2

Airport facilities

Infrastructure
Jet fuel is supplied via the Portland Jet Line, an  Kinder Morgan fuel pipeline running from the Northwest Industrial area of Portland's Willbridge Terminal to the airport. Willbridge contains 40 tanks, connected to the  Olympic pipeline and  Eugene pipeline, BNSF rail, truck, and ships.

Bicycle resources
The lower terminal roadway near the TriMet MAX Red Line station has a work station and assembly for repairing bicycles. The Oregon Welcome Center also has a "Tool check-out".

Mini-movie theater
In February 2017, the Hollywood Theatre opened a microcinema within the post-security section of concourse C near gate C5. The theater has seventeen seats, with an additional standing only room. The films shown run for approximately fifteen minutes, are free of charge and showcase the work of Portland-based filmmakers, primarily focused on the culture of the Pacific Northwest.

Distillery
Operating at Portland International Airport since the summer of 2013, House Spirits Distillery upgraded and expanded their presence at the airport in 2017 from a mobile kiosk to a larger, permanent retail location within concourse C, across from gate C6. Known for the anchor of Portland's "Distillery Row", House Spirits Distillery was recognized as the nation's "Best New Specialty Retail Concept, Small Operator" as awarded in 2015 by the Airport Revenue News. They were recognized for their immersive retail experience at the airport and its offerings of product tastings, branded apparel and distilled beverages. House Spirits Distillery is currently the first distillery in the world to operate a spirits tasting room within an airport location.

In addition to selling spirits and other curated items, House Spirits Distillery will also provide mini classes to introduce PDX fliers to their products during airport down time. The new retail experience is inspired by their new facility in Southeast Portland which opened in November 2015 and expanded the company's production capacity sixfold.

Airlines and destinations

Passenger

Cargo

Statistics

Top destinations

Airline market share

Annual traffic

Ground transportation

Public transit service to the airport is provided by TriMet, the metropolitan area's primary transit agency, with its MAX Red Line light rail service. During late nights, service is provided by the 272-PDX Night Bus route. The 1986-opened MAX Light Rail system was extended to the airport in 2001. The Red Line originally provided service as far as downtown Portland only, but in 2003 it was extended west to Beaverton. Prior to 2001, TriMet service to the airport consisted of bus route 72-82nd Avenue from 1970 to 1986, and route 12-Sandy Blvd. from 1986 to 2001.

C-Tran route 67 bus connects the airport to Fisher's Landing Transit Center in east Vancouver, Washington.

By road, the terminal is accessible from exit 24 on Interstate 205.

Accidents and incidents
On October 1, 1966, West Coast Airlines Flight 956 crashed in a desolate section of the Mount Hood National Forest during descent into Portland International Airport. Of the 18 passengers and crew, there were no survivors. The probable cause of the accident was "the descent of the aircraft below its clearance limit and below that of surrounding obstructing terrain, but the Board was unable to determine the cause of such descent." The accident was the first loss of a Douglas DC-9.
On December 28, 1978, United Airlines Flight 173 was en route to Portland International Airport from Stapleton International Airport in Denver, Colorado. On approach to Portland International Airport, the crew lowered the landing gear which caused a loud thump, abnormal vibration, unusual yaw, and the landing gear indicator lights failed to light. The plane circled Portland while the crew investigated the problem. After about an hour, the plane exhausted its fuel supply and crashed into the suburban neighborhood of East Burnside Street and NE 158th Ave. Of the 189 passengers and crew on board, ten died and 24 more were injured. An investigation revealed that the crash was caused by "the failure of the captain to properly monitor the aircraft's fuel state". This accident's investigation led to substantially improved aviation safety by widespread adoption of crew resource management which emphasizes crew teamwork and communication instead of a command hierarchy.
On February 16, 2008, visibility of 1/8 mile was a possible factor in the fatal accident that took the life of the pilot, Oregon doctor Richard Otoski, a Klamath Falls dermatologist flying his Columbia 400. The accident took place just short of runway 10R at Portland International Airport. Otoski was the only person on board the aircraft, manufactured by the former Lancair Company. "Damn it... we're gonna crash" were the last words PDX controllers heard from N621ER. The aircraft was apparently in the process of making another missed approach in poor visibility following the ILS when it clipped an airport perimeter fence, crashed, and soon caught fire. The aircraft had departed from Klamath Falls 90 minutes earlier.

Airport ratings

Travel + Leisure
In 2013, a Travel + Leisure magazine readers' poll named PDX as the best US airport, based on its on-time record, dining, shopping, and mass transportation into the main parts of the city. In 2015, ten new restaurants opened at PDX, making it a "foodie haven" according to travelers. PDX also got significant recognition for its unique carpet pattern, which was replaced throughout the entire airport with newer carpet that contains a similar design.

Condé Nast Traveler
In 2006, 2007, 2008, and 2010, PDX was identified as the top airport for business travelers in the United States by Condé Nast Traveler magazine. The Condé Nast ranking was based upon criteria including location and access, ease of connections, food, shops, amenities, comfort and design, and perceived safety and security; PDX received the top overall score, and the magazine noted the airport's environmentally friendly initiatives, including the airport's use of solar panels for power, its connection to the MAX Light Rail, and the recycling of its restaurants' used oil and grease.

J. D. Power and Associates
The 2015, 2016, and 2019 J.D. Power and Associates rankings for US "Large Passenger Airports" lists PDX at the #1 spot and overall highest among passenger satisfaction criteria.

Air Line Pilots Association, International
In 2015 the Air Line Pilots Association, International, Airport and Ground Environment Group recognized Portland International Airport as the recipient of the Airport of the Year. The award was given as a result of the collaboration and partnering between PDX and ALPA on important on-going airport safety and construction issues.

Gallery

See also

 Oregon World War II Army Airfields
 Pearson Field
 Portland-Mulino Airport
 Tourism in Portland, Oregon
 Western Air Defense Force

References

External links

Airport Wayfinder: Interactive video guide and detailed information about Portland International Airport
 
 

 
1936 establishments in Oregon
Airports established in 1936
Airports in Multnomah County, Oregon
Airports in Portland, Oregon
Northeast Portland, Oregon
Port of Portland (Oregon)
Works Progress Administration in Oregon